, formerly  was an Imperial Japanese Army officer who was a member of a cadet line of the Japanese imperial family and husband of Emperor Hirohito's eldest daughter.

Early life 
The eldest son and heir of Prince Naruhiko Higashikuni, Prince Morihiro had the distinction of being a grandson of Emperor Meiji and simultaneously both a first cousin and a son-in-law of Emperor Hirohito. He was born in Tokyo, and like most male members of the imperial family during the Empire of Japan, was groomed to pursue a career in the military from an early age.

Military career 
After graduation from the Gakushuin Peers’ School and the Central Military Preparatory School, Prince Higashikuni served for a session in the House of Peers. He graduated from the 49th class of Imperial Japanese Army Academy in June 1937, and was commissioned as a second lieutenant of field artillery in August. The following March, he was promoted to lieutenant in the IJA First Artillery Regiment, and was stationed in Manchukuo.

During the Nomonhan Incident in summer 1939, he commanded the First Battery, 1st Heavy Field Artillery Regiment of the Kwantung Army. He withdrew in face of the Soviet counter-offensive without orders during the heat of battle, and was transferred back to Japan on 2 August 1939. The incident was suppressed by Japanese military censors, but provided much propaganda for the Soviet Army. Despite this apparent blot on his service record, he was promoted to captain of the artillery in March 1941. He attended the Army War College from December 1942 to December 1943, and on graduation was promoted to major and placed on the reserve list.

Marriage and family 

On 10 October 1943, Prince Higashikuni married seventeen-year-old Princess Shigeko (9 December 1925 – 23 July 1961), the eldest daughter of Emperor Shōwa and Empress Kōjun, who was widely known by her childhood appellation Teru-no-miya. The bride and groom were related several times over through their common descent from Emperor Meiji and Prince Kuni Asahiko (the father of Prince Naruhiko Higashikuni and the grandfather of Empress Kōjun).

The couple had five children, the last three of whom were born after the Higashikuni family was removed from the Imperial Household register:

; married Miss Yoshiko Shimada in 1973, and had two sons, Masahiko Higashikuni (b. 1973) and unknown boy (b. 2014).
 ; married Mr. Kazutoshi Omura later to Mr. Takagi Daikichi.
 : adopted by the Mibu family as "Motohiro Mibu"
 ; married to Ms. Kazuko Sato, with two sons, Teruhiko and Mutsuhiko
  married Mr. Azuma Naooki.

His first wife, former Princess Shigeko, died of cancer in July 1961. In 1964, Morihiro Higashikuni married Miss Yoshiko Terao. The second marriage produced two children:

Later life 
In October 1947, the Higashikuni and other branches of the Japanese Imperial Family were divested of their titles and privileges during the American occupation of Japan and became commoners. As a commoner, he attempted several unsuccessful business ventures before eventually becoming the chief of the research division of the Hokkaido Mining and Steamship Company. He died of lung cancer at St. Luke's International Hospital in Tokyo in 1969.

Ancestry

Gallery

References 

 Coox, Alvin D. Nomonhan: Japan Against Russia, 1939. Stanford University Press; Reprint edition (1990). 
 Dower, John W. Embracing Defeat: Japan in the Wake of World War II. W. W. Norton & Company (2000).

External links 

 The former Higashikuni summer villa in Yokohama (Japanese site)

1917 births
1969 deaths
Higashikuni-no-miya
Japanese princes
Heirs apparent who never acceded
People from Tokyo
Imperial Japanese Army personnel of World War II
Children of prime ministers of Japan
Deaths from lung cancer in Japan
Imperial Japanese Army officers
Members of the Kwantung Army
Military personnel of the Second Sino-Japanese War